Portugal competed at the 2004 Summer Olympics in Athens, Greece, from 13 to 29 August 2004. Portuguese athletes have competed at every Summer Olympic Games in the modern era since 1912. The Olympic Committee of Portugal sent the nation's second-largest team to the Games. A total of 81 athletes, 64 men and 17 women, were selected by the committee to participate in 15 sports. Men's football was the only team-based sport in which Portugal had its representation at these Games. There was only a single competitor in badminton, canoeing, equestrian, artistic and trampoline gymnastics, triathlon, and wrestling, which made its official Olympic comeback after an eight-year absence.

Twenty-four Portuguese athletes had previously competed in Sydney, including two returning Olympic medalists: long-distance runner and former champion Fernanda Ribeiro and lightweight judoka Nuno Delgado, who later became the nation's flag bearer in the opening ceremony. Mistral windsurfer and multiple-time European champion João Rodrigues and middle-distance runner Carla Sacramento shared their experiences at these Games as the only athletes who made their fourth Olympic appearance. Equestrian rider Carlos Grave, aged 46, was the oldest athlete of the team, while breaststroke swimmer Diana Gomes was the youngest at age 15. Among the Portuguese athletes on the team, two of them had acquired dual citizenship to compete for Portugal: former hurdler Naide Gomes from São Tomé and Príncipe in the women's heptathlon, and sprinter Francis Obikwelu on his third Olympic bid after he previously joined the Nigerian squad in Atlanta and Sydney.

Portugal left Athens with only three Olympic medals, two silver and one bronze, improving the nation's stark medal tally from Sydney four years earlier. The highlight of the Games for the Portuguese team came on the first day with a historic milestone for Sérgio Paulinho, as the nation's first-ever cyclist to claim a silver medal in the men's road race. The remaining medals were awarded to the athletes in the track and field. On August 22, 2004, Obikwelu challenged the Americans in the men's 100 metres, but he managed to settle only for the silver. Meanwhile, Rui Silva added another medal for Portugal with a blistering bronze in the men's 1500 metres, which was dominated by Morocco's Hicham El Guerrouj.

Medalists

Athletics

Portuguese athletes have so far achieved qualifying standards in the following athletics events (up to a maximum of 3 athletes in each event at the 'A' Standard, and 1 at the 'B' Standard).

Men
Track & road events

Field events

Women
Track & road events

Field events

Combined events – Heptathlon

Badminton

Canoeing

Sprint

Qualification Legend: Q = Qualify to final; q = Qualify to semifinal

Cycling

Road

Equestrian

Eventing

Fencing

Men

Football

Men's tournament

Roster

Group play

Gymnastics

Artistic
Men

Trampoline

Judo

Four Portuguese judoka (three men and one woman) qualified for the 2004 Summer Olympics.

Men

Women

Sailing

Portuguese sailors have qualified one boat for each of the following events.

Men

Women

Open

M = Medal race; OCS = On course side of the starting line; DSQ = Disqualified; DNF = Did not finish; DNS= Did not start; RDG = Redress given

Shooting

Two Portuguese shooters qualified to compete in the following events:

Men

Swimming

Portuguese swimmers earned qualifying standards in the following events (up to a maximum of 2 swimmers in each event at the A-standard time, and 1 at the B-standard time):

Men

Women

Triathlon

Portugal sent a single triathlete to Athens.

Volleyball

Beach

Wrestling

Men's Greco-Roman

See also
 Portugal at the 2004 Summer Paralympics

References

External links
Official Report of the XXVIII Olympiad
Olympic Committee of Portugal 

Nations at the 2004 Summer Olympics
2004
Summer Olympics